Berill (Russian: Берилл) is a peak in the Suntar-Khayata Range.

The elevation above sea level of the mountain is 2,933 m. It is the highest point of Khabarovsk Krai.

See also
List of highest points of Russian federal subjects
List of mountains and hills of Russia

Notes

Mountains of Khabarovsk Krai
Highest points of Russian federal subjects
Suntar-Khayata